Main Prem Ki Diwani Hoon (English: I am crazy about Prem (Prem also means love)), is a 2003 Indian Hindi-language romantic comedy drama film by Sooraj Barjatya and produced by Rajshri Productions. The film is a remake of the 1976 film Chitchor and features Hrithik Roshan, Kareena Kapoor and Abhishek Bachchan in lead roles. It had a worldwide release on 27 June 2003, and was a critical disaster at the box office.
However, Bachchan's performance was well received and earned him a nomination for the Filmfare Award for Best Supporting Actor at the 49th Filmfare Awards.

Roshan's and Bachchan's characters, as with the protagonists of every Sooraj Barjatya film until Uunchai, are named Prem.

Plot 
Sanjana (Kareena Kapoor) is a vivacious young woman. She has just graduated from college and is not happy about the concept of arranged marriage, much to the dismay of her mother Susheela (Himani Shivpuri).

Roopa, Sanjana's older sister, who has settled in the U.S., calls up her parents to inform them that her friend, Prem, has seen Sanjana's photo and is interested in getting to know her. Prem is a wealthy businessman, settled in the U.S. with his parents. Sanjana is not pleased with this development but she eventually agrees and meets Prem Kishen (Hrithik Roshan).

At first, Sanjana can't stand the enthusiastic and outgoing Prem, and plays a series of pranks on him. As they begin to spend more time together, they eventually fall in love, much to the delight of her parents who adore him too. He returns to the U.S. for his job and promises to come back. However, Roopa informs the family that Prem could not make it, so someone else was sent in his place.

Sanjana's confused parents find out that there was a mix-up. The man who arrived was not the wealthy N.R.I. Prem Kumar, whom Sanjana was meant to meet. Instead, he is Prem Kishen, an employee in Prem Kumar's company.

Prem Kumar (Abhishek Bachchan) arrives in India and meets Sanjana and begins to have feelings for her. Sanjana's mother slowly tries to push her towards Prem Kumar, though her father (Pankaj Kapur) has reservations because he knows how much Sanjana and Prem Kishan are in love.

Prem Kumar and Sanjana begin spending time together and become friends due to their common interests, but Sanjana remains committed to Prem Kishen. Prem Kishan returns to Sanjana's house, where he is treated coldly by her mother and witnesses Prem Kumar's feelings for Sanjana. He reveals the truth to her – that his boss was supposed to marry her and not him. Sanjana is devastated.

A marriage is arranged for Sanjana and Prem Kumar by their respective mothers. Prem Kishen's loyalty to his boss and his boss' happiness forces him to leave, while a heartbroken Sanjana agrees only for the sake of her parents. Eventually, Prem Kumar learns the truth and unites Sanjana with Prem Kishen.

Cast
Hrithik Roshan as Prem Kishen Mathur
Kareena Kapoor as Sanjana Satyaprakash
Abhishek Bachchan as Prem Kumar
Ritu Vasishtha as Sanjana's Friend
 Perizaad Kolah as Sanjana's Friend
 Raju Shrivastava as Shambhu
 Vrajesh Hirjee
 Reema Lagoo as Prem Kumar's Mother
 Ranbir Kapoor as Vicky Youngistaan
 Shobha Khote as Mother Fernandes
 Johny Lever as Johnny
 Farida Jalal
 Ruby Bhatia Special appearance
 Pankaj Kapoor as Satyaprakash
 Himani Shivpuri as Sanjana's mother
 Upasna Singh
 Kunal Vijaykar
 Jaaved Jaaferi Special Appearance

Soundtrack 

The music of this film was composed by Anu Malik and all songs sung by K. S. Chithra. All the lyrics were penned by Dev Kohili. According to the Indian trade website Box Office India, with around 16,00,000 units sold, this film's soundtrack album was the year's seventh highest-selling.

References

External links 
 
 

2000s Hindi-language films
2003 films
Remakes of Indian films
Indian romantic musical films
Rajshri Productions films
Films directed by Sooraj Barjatya
Films scored by Anu Malik
Films distributed by Yash Raj Films
2003 romantic comedy-drama films
Indian romantic comedy-drama films
2003 comedy films
2003 drama films